Francisco Javier Alcaraz (born 4 October 1960) is a Paraguayan football forward who played for Paraguay in the 1986 FIFA World Cup. He also played for Club Nacional.

References

External links
FIFA profile

1960 births
Paraguayan footballers
Paraguay international footballers
Association football forwards
Club Nacional footballers
1986 FIFA World Cup players
Living people